Sounde is a village in the Karmala taluka of Solapur district in Maharashtra state, India.

Demographics
Covering  and comprising 311 households at the time of the 2011 census of India, Sounde had a population of 1,346. There were 723 males and 623 females, with 160 people being aged six or younger.

References

Villages in Karmala taluka